The Erlöserbund is a German Catholic convent founded in 1917 by Else Mayer and Alexandra Bischoff in Bonn.

At the time of its approbation by the archbishop Joseph Frings of Cologne in 1958 the content had 148 registered nuns in several Locations in Bonn, Breslau and other locations. Besides being a women's convent the organization also supported women rights and helped women to get into schools and universities which was still unusual at the time.

The convent closed in 2005 and became a non for profit organization. In a yearly award ceremony in Bonn a stipend is give to several select women who are doing outstanding work in the area of women's rights, academia and religious studies.

References 

Convents in Germany
Organisations based in Bonn
1917 establishments in Germany
2005 disestablishments in Germany